Colton Storm (born July 5, 1994) is an American former professional soccer player who played as a defender, primarily as a right-back.

Career

College & Youth
Storm played four years of college soccer at UNC-Chapel Hill between 2013 and 2016. While at college, Storm also appeared for USL PDL sides Reading United AC and Portland Timbers U23s.

Professional
On January 13, 2017, Storm was drafted in the first-round (14th overall) during the 2017 MLS SuperDraft by Sporting Kansas City. He signed with the club on February 25, 2017.

Storm made his professional debut with Kansas City's United Soccer League affiliate Swope Park Rangers, on March 25, 2017 against Oklahoma City Energy.

On August 14, 2019, Storm was signed by North Carolina FC for the remainder of the 2019 USL Championship season.

Personal
On April 1, 2017, Colton Storm was pranked by his fellow Sporting Kansas City teammates Dom Dwyer and Soony Saad. Storm believed he was speaking to a girl named Joanna, and introduced himself as another man  named Mark from Cabo. Storm was actually was in contact with Dwyer who was responding through Joanna's social media account.  Storm showed up to a local Kansas City café and was met by Sporting Kansas City's manager Peter Vermes.  Vermes told Storm that he knew that Storm was pretending to be "Mark from Cabo" and told him Joanna was not coming.  Storm then saw his teammates Dwyer and Saad and realized that he had been catfished.

References

External links 
 
 
 https://www.foxsports.com/stories/soccer/watch-sporting-kc-put-the-fear-of-god-into-a-rookie-with-classic-april-fools-prank

1994 births
Living people
American soccer players
Association football defenders
North Carolina FC players
North Carolina Tar Heels men's soccer players
People from Mechanicsburg, Pennsylvania
Portland Timbers U23s players
Reading United A.C. players
Soccer players from Pennsylvania
Sporting Kansas City draft picks
Sporting Kansas City players
Sportspeople from Harrisburg, Pennsylvania
Sporting Kansas City II players
USL Championship players
USL League Two players